Shendzhy is a rural locality (an aul) and the administrative center of Shendzhyskoye Rural Settlement of Takhtamukaysky District, the Republic of Adygea, Russia. The population was 1942 as of 2018. There are 33 streets.

Geography 
Shendzhy is located 9 km southeast of Takhtamukay (the district's administrative centre) by road. Krasnoarmeysky is the nearest rural locality.

Ethnicity 
The aul is inhabited by Circassians.

References 

Rural localities in Takhtamukaysky District